Vorobyovo is a rural locality (a selo) in Alexeyevsky District, Belgorod Oblast, Russia. The population was 179 as of 2010. There are 2 streets.

Geography 
Vorobyovo is located 25 km east of Alexeyevka (the district's administrative centre) by road. Pirogovo is the nearest rural locality.

References 

Rural localities in Alexeyevsky District, Belgorod Oblast
Biryuchensky Uyezd